Amalie Konsa (also known as Brigitta; 10 March 1873 – 19 July 1949), was an Estonian stage actress and singer usually based in Tartu. She was known as the "grandmother of the Estonian theatre"

Life

Konsa was born Amalie-Luise Konts in Raadi Parish (now, Tartu Parish) in 1873. She came from a large family and received only primary education at St. John's Church, Tartu.

She started acting in 1886 in the important Estonian culture group of the Vanemuine Choir. She was chosen by August Wiera to join his troupe and she then played on and off from 1906 to 1949 with the Vanemuine. In an interview when she was 70 she said that acting had been the "greatest joy in her life". She was the only actress employed by the theatre leader August Wiera who was re-employed to join the later Karl Menning troupe. She was known as the "grandmother of the Estonian theatre" and she appeared on stage over 50 years whilst nearly always living in Tartu.

In 1927 she had played the mother of one of the protagonists in the Estonian film Noored kotkad ("Young Eagles"). The film was set against the background of when the Bolsheviks interfered with the Estonian War of Independence. The film was digitally restored in 2008.

Konsa died in a bus accident in Tartu in 1949. She has a plaque to her memory on the house where she lived in Ülikooli 11 in Tartu. The incorporated sculpture is by Elmar Rebane.

The Estonian Theatre and Music Museum has a collection of her pictures.

Awards and honours
 Honorary actress (1936)
 Gold badge of merit of the Estonian Association of Actors 1936. 
 Meritorious artist of the Estonian SSR (1948)

References

1873 births
1949 deaths
Estonian stage actresses
Estonian film actresses
Estonian silent film actresses
People from Tartu Parish
20th-century Estonian actresses
Road incident deaths in Estonia
Burials at Raadi cemetery
Actresses from the Russian Empire
Women singers from the Russian Empire